The Quebec Boundaries Extension Act, 1912 was passed by the Parliament of Canada on April 1, 1912. It expanded the territory of the Province of Quebec, extending the northern boundary to its present location. The act transferred to the province all of the Northwest Territories' former District of Ungava except offshore islands in Hudson Bay. This was a vast area bounded by the Eastmain River, the Labrador coast, and Hudson and Ungava Bays. It was first claimed by Britain in 1670 as Rupert's Land by royal decree, becoming part of Canada after Confederation. The lands are the traditional territory of the aboriginal First Nations of Cree, Montagnais, Naskapi, and Inuit, who continue to inhabit the land.

The Quebec Boundary Extension Act, 1898 had granted the province its first territorial enlargement into the Northwest Territories. The 1912 act was pursuant to a resolution of the House of Commons of Canada on 13 July 1908, which also led to the Manitoba Boundaries Extension Act, 1912 and Ontario Boundaries Extension Act, 1912, which transferred more territory around Hudson Bay to Manitoba and Ontario from the Northwest Territories' District of Keewatin.

Canada and Newfoundland disagreed on the location of the frontier between Quebec and Labrador until 1927. The Canadian government accepted Newfoundland and Labrador's claimed frontier, however Quebec continues to dispute it: see Newfoundland and Labrador–Quebec border.

References

External links

 Reproduction of The Quebec Boundaries Extension Act, 1912 (at pages 239 to 241 of the PDF) printed in 1913

Canadian federal legislation
Political history of Quebec
Borders of Quebec
1912 in Canadian law
1912 in Quebec